The Tornados (The Tornadoes in North America) were an English instrumental rock group of the 1960s that acted as backing group for many of record producer Joe Meek's productions and also for singer Billy Fury. They enjoyed several chart hits in their own right, including the UK and US No. 1 "Telstar" (named after the satellite and composed and produced by Meek), the first US No. 1 single by a British group. Today Dave Watts has his own version of the band.

History 
The Tornados were formed in 1961 as a session band for Joe Meek, although the name did not come until early 1962. In 1961 they provided the instrumentals for the film short The Johnny Leyton Touch, including a jazzed up version of "Taboo", originally by Margarita Lecuona. From January 1962 to August 1963, The Tornados were the backing band for Billy Fury (as well as recording and performing as an act in their own right); they toured and recorded with Fury as The Tornados. Their recordings with Fury were produced by Mike Smith and Ivor Raymonde.

The Tornados made a scopitone film (an early form of music video) for "Telstar" and another for their chart hit "Robot" featuring members of the group walking around a woodland dressed in appropriate headgear with their guitars, flirting with various young women and being finally arrested by policemen after lighting a campfire.

For a time The Tornados were considered serious rivals to The Shadows. The Tornados' single "Globetrotter" made it to #5 in the UK Singles Chart. However, pop instrumentals began to lose a following with the British audience during 1963 as the "Mersey Sound", from the Beatles and other groups, began to take root. In the summer of 1963, Joe Meek induced The Tornados' bassist Heinz Burt to start a solo career, as The Tornados' chart success as an instrumental outfit waned, and from that point onwards The Tornados began to fall apart. By 1965 none of the original line-up remained.

On some promotional items, later line-ups were credited as "Tornados '65" and "The New Tornados", but these names were never used on The Tornados' releases. In the mid-1960s The Tornados backed Billy Fury again, with Dave Watts on keyboards, Robby Gale on guitar and John Davies on drums. In 1968, in Israel to perform in Mandy Rice-Davies' night club "Mandys", the band stayed for a ten-week tour after which they disbanded, leaving Watts and Huxley in Israel, playing with The Lions of Judea and The Churchills, respectively.

Later years 
After drummer and bandleader Clem Cattini left The Tornados in 1965, he became a successful session musician, playing on recording sessions for other artists, and was featured in Cliff Richard's backing bands. He holds the record for appearing the most times on UK #1 singles.

Rhythm guitarist George Bellamy is the father of Matt Bellamy, the front man for British alternative rock band Muse.

They re-formed as The New Tornados in the early 1970s as the backing group for Marty Wilde, Billy Fury and others on a year-long UK Rock n Roll Tour. They continued for another few years with lead guitarist Tony Cowell and drummer Jon Werrell touring with original members Norman Hale and Heinz Burt, plus "The King of Rock Roll" Carl Simmons. The group was often part of a 1960s package with other artists, including Wee Willie Harris and Screaming Lord Sutch.

Jon Werrell loaned his Silver Premier drum kit to John Bonham when Led Zeppelin played their famous impromptu December 1975 gig at Behans St Helier while tax exiles in Jersey.

In 1975, Clem Cattini, Roger LaVern, Heinz Burt and George Bellamy reunited and released a version of "Telstar" as the 'Original Tornados'. In the 1970s, Billy Fury formed a new backing band called Fury's Tornados with a completely unrelated line-up. They also recorded and released a version of "Telstar" in the mid 1970s.

In 1996, Ray Randall wrote and recorded a three-track CD with Bryan Irwin and Stuart Taylor, using the band name Ray Randall's Tornados, as a tribute to the late Joe Meek, 30 years after Meek's death. Randall has since recorded a solo album entitled Polly Swallow (1997).

In 2007, Panda Bear sampled two Tornados songs on his album Person Pitch.

"Do You Come Here Often?" 
The B-side of the final single that the group released, in 1966, "Do You Come Here Often?", is considered to be the first openly "gay" pop record release by a UK major label. It started off as a standard organ-inspired instrumental, but Joe Meek decided that the organ playing was a little too jazzy for the style of the group. To remedy this, around two-thirds in, a casual conversation between what appears to be two gay men (Dave Watts playing keyboards and Robb Huxley playing guitar) was overdubbed. The song was featured, along with other gay-flavoured releases, on a 2006 compilation CD, Queer Noises.

Former members 
Heinz Burt – bass (1960–1963)
Clem Cattini – drums (1960–1965)
Norman Hale – keyboards (1962)
Roger LaVern – keyboards (1962–1964)
George Bellamy – rhythm guitar (1962–1965)
Alan Caddy – lead guitar (1962–1965)
Brian Gregg – bass (1963)
Tab Martin – bass (1963)
Ray Randall – bass (1963–1966)
Jimmy O'Brien – keyboards (1964–1965)
Stuart Taylor – lead guitar (1964–1965)
Tony Marsh – keyboards (1965)
Peter Adams – drums (1965–1966)
Dave Cameron – lead guitar (1965–1966)
Bryan Irwin – rhythm guitar (1965–1966)
Roger Warwick – tenor saxophone (1965–1966)
Dave Watts – keyboards (1965–1967)
John Davies – drums (1966–1967)
Pete Holder – lead guitar, vocals (1966–1967)
Roger Holder – bass (1966–1967)
Robb Huxley – lead guitar (1966–1967)
Tony Cowell – lead guitar (1972–1974) The New Tornados backing Billy Fury, Marty Wilde, Heinz Burt, Norman Hale etc. 
Jon Werrell – drums (1973–1974) The New Tornados with original members Heinz Burt and pianist Norman Hale

Discography

Albums 

 The Original Telstar – The Sounds of the Tornadoes (London, 1962) (only released in North America and Australasia) – US #45
 Away from It All (Decca, 1963)
 We Want Billy! (Decca, 1963) (with Billy Fury, live album) – UK #14
The World of the Tornados (Decca Records, 1972)
Remembering... the Tornados (Decca Records, 1976)
Away From It All (Deram, 1994)
The EP Collection (See for Miles Records, 1996)
 Tornados Now (Startel Records, 1997)
 Telstar (Castle Pie Records, 1999)
 Science Fiction (Secret Records, 2007)

EPs

Singles 

Notes

References

External links 

Band biography on rockabilly.nl
Billy Fury's backing groups
The Peddlers: The Tornados

English rock music groups
English pop music groups
British instrumental musical groups
Decca Records artists
London Records artists
Musical groups established in 1962
Musical groups from London
1962 establishments in England